The dhak is a huge membranophone instrument from India. The shapes differ from the almost cylindrical to the barrel. The manner of stretching the hide over the mouths and lacing also varies. It suspended from the neck, tied to the waist and kept on the lap or the ground, and usually played with wooden sticks. The left side is coated to give it a heavier sound.

Drum beats are an integral part of Durga Puja. It is mostly played by the Bengali Hindu community.

The Statesman wrote, "Durga Puja does not assume the festive aura without the maddening beats of the dhak, the large drum that people hang around their necks and play with two thin sticks to infuse the frenzied rhythm into listeners. Those enchanting beats are enough to conjure up the sights and smells of Durga Puja."

See also
 Dholak

References

Membranophones
Bangladeshi musical instruments
Indian musical instruments
Culture of West Bengal